Scooby-Doo! and Kiss: Rock and Roll Mystery (stylized as Scooby-Doo! and KISS: Rock and Roll Mystery) is a 2015 direct-to-DVD animated crossover comedy mystery film, and the twenty-fifth entry in the direct-to-video series of Scooby-Doo films. It was released digitally on July 10, 2015, and was released on DVD and Blu-ray on July 21, 2015. The design of the film is inspired by Jack Kirby's comics.

It is also the last Scooby-Doo production featuring Mindy Cohn as Velma Dinkley since Kate Micucci would take over the role the same year.

Plot
Fred, Daphne, Velma, Shaggy and Scooby-Doo travel to an amusement park called Kiss World to see Kiss at their big Halloween concert and solve a mystery, mostly because Daphne has a crush on Starchild (Paul Stanley), much to Fred's jealousy. However, when the gang arrive, security chief and former government defense employee Delilah Domino refuse to let them in, so they sneak in and are caught by Delilah. At that moment, Kiss arrives, and after the gang explains they are there to help, they tell Delilah the kids are free to stay, to which she reluctantly agrees. The Demon (Gene Simmons) initially opposes the idea due to Scooby accidentally spraying a water gun on him when he came to Shaggy and Scooby for a surprise visit, but later relents. As the gang split up for clues, Shaggy and Scooby are chased by an entity; Kiss comes to their aid. They tell the gang the entity is called the Crimson Witch, and she has been terrorizing the park for a while, and they need her to disappear before the concert.

A strange fortune-teller named Chikara says the witch is from an alternate universe called Kissteria and plans to use the Black Diamond Kiss uses in their hit song "Detroit Rock City" to summon a monster called The Destroyer to conquer the Earth, which Velma finds hard to believe. To stop the Crimson Witch, the gang uses the diamond to lure the witch. However, the Crimson Witch chases them through a portal to Kissteria. She manages to steal the diamond and unleash The Destroyer, but the gang and Kiss arrive in a spaceship to stop the monster. The gang then returns to Earth, where they wake up believing the witch's gas caused them all to have a hallucination. They unmask the Crimson Witch as Delilah, who wished to sell the Black Diamond (needed for laser technology) to a competing defense company as revenge against her former employers.

Later, the Starchild kisses Daphne right in front of Fred. Daphne then kisses Fred on the cheek, much to his delight. The Demon gives Shaggy and Scooby a smile. Shaggy and Scooby then see Kiss fly away with the black diamond. Shaggy asks Scooby if they should tell Velma about what they saw. However, Scooby suggests they do not, stating: "why rock her world?"

Voice cast
Kiss
 Paul Stanley as The Starchild
 Gene Simmons as The Demon
 Tommy Thayer as The Spaceman
 Eric Singer as The Catman

Scooby-Doo
 Frank Welker as Fred Jones and Scooby-Doo
 Matthew Lillard as Shaggy Rogers
 Grey DeLisle as Daphne Blake
 Mindy Cohn as Velma Dinkley

Other
 Jennifer Carpenter as Chikara
 Garry Marshall as Manny Goldman
 Penny Marshall as The Elder
 Doc McGhee as Chip McGhoo
 Jason Mewes as Worker #1
 Pauley Perrette as Delilah Domino, The Crimson Witch
 Rachel Ramras as Shandi Strutter
 Darius Rucker as The Destroyer
 Kevin Smith as Worker #2
 Tony Cervone as Announcer

Soundtrack
All of the songs featured in this film are by Kiss, including the one new song made for the picture, "Don't Touch My Ascot".

References

External links 
 

2015 direct-to-video films
2015 animated films
2015 films
2010s American animated films
2010s animated superhero films
American children's animated mystery films
American children's animated comedy films
American children's animated superhero films
American films about Halloween
American television films
Animation based on real people
American rock music films
Animated crossover films
Cultural depictions of Kiss (band)
2010s English-language films
Films about Halloween
Films directed by Spike Brandt
Films directed by Tony Cervone
Films set in amusement parks
Scooby-Doo direct-to-video animated films
Warner Bros. direct-to-video animated films
2010s children's animated films
Heavy metal mass media